Saratoga is a town in Wood County, Wisconsin, United States. As of the 2015 census, the population of the town is 5,023 people.

History
The west end of Saratoga, within three miles of the Wisconsin River, was in the "Indian strip," sold by the Menominee to the U.S. government in the 1836 Treaty of the Cedars. As such, it was logged and surveyed early. In 1839 a crew working for the U.S. government first surveyed what would become parts of Saratoga, walking through the woods and crossing the river, measuring with chain and compass. In 1851 a different crew surveyed the section lines. For the six mile square that now contains western Saratoga, see their description under Port Edwards. For the eastern six miles of Saratoga, they gave this general description:
The Character of this town is easily described. It is a uniform pine barren. Soil white sand. Poor & worthless for all farming purposes. The timber poor scrubby Pitch pines & there is not probably a single quarter section in it worth Entering either(?) for soil or timber.

Saratoga township was established in 1857.

Geography
According to the United States Census Bureau, the town has a total area of 51.2 square miles (132.5 km2), of which, 49.4 square miles (128.0 km2) of it is land and 1.8 square miles (4.6 km2) of it (3.44%) is water.

Demographics
According to the 2015 census, there is 5,023 people, 2,011 households, and 1,560 families residing in the town. The population density  is low, it amounts to 104 people per square mile. There were 2,058 housing units at an average density of 41.6 per square mile (16.1/km2). The racial makeup of the town was 97.42% White, 0.17% African American, 0.71% Native American, 0.58% Asian, 0.32% from other races, and 0.82% from two or more races. Hispanic or Latino of any race were 0.54% of the population.

There were 2,011 households, out of which 35.8% had children under the age of 18 living with them, 66.1% were married couples living together, 7.0% had a female householder with no husband present, and 22.4% were non-families. 17.1% of all households were made up of individuals, and 5.4% had someone living alone who was 65 years of age or older. The average household size was 2.66 and the average family size was 2.99.

In the town, the population was spread out, with 26.3% under the age of 18, 7.1% from 18 to 24, 29.4% from 25 to 44, 27.0% from 45 to 64, and 10.1% who were 65 years of age or older. The median age was 38 years. For every 100 females, there were 106.6 males. For every 100 females age 18 and over, there were 105.0 males.

The median income for a household in the town was $48,500, and the median income for a family was $52,750. Males had a median income of $41,518 versus $24,904 for females. The per capita income for the town was $18,761. About 3.8% of families and 5.9% of the population were below the poverty line, including 6.0% of those under age 18 and 13.0% of those age 65 or over.

References

External links
 Town of Saratoga, Wisconsin website
 1852 plat maps of Saratoga west and east
 1879 plat maps of west and east
 1896 plat maps of west and east
 1909 plat map
 1928 plat map
 1956 plat maps of west and east

Towns in Wood County, Wisconsin
Towns in Wisconsin